Schmidlin is a surname. Notable people with the surname include:

Frank K. Schmidlin (1861–1939), Australian X-ray pioneer
Rick Schmidlin (born 1954), American film preservationist and silent film scholar
Walter Schmidlin, Swiss footballer

See also
Mero-Schmidlin, British construction company